Das Haus der Krokodile (roughly translated as House of Crocodiles) is a 1976 German children's television miniseries based on the 1971 mystery novel by Helmut Ballot.  Directed by Wilhelm ten Haaf, and starring Tommi Ohrner, the six-part miniseries premiered on the ARD on February 22, 1976.

Synopsis
Playing alone one night while his parents are on vacation, twelve-year-old Victor Laroche (Tommi Ohrner) glimpses a mysterious masked man behind him in the mirror and soon begins to uncover a mystery surrounding the death of a girl named Cecilia who fell over a stair railing in the house 20 years earlier. Although not entirely convinced of his story, Victor's sisters Cora (Carolin Ohrner) and Louise (Evelyn Palek) agree to help him investigate the girl's mysterious death. With the help of an elderly uncle who was Cecilia's father (Oskar Schwab) and an old friend of Cecilia's (Robert Naegele), the Laroche children piece together the mystery of the death of their cousin, the unknown man in the mirror, and a little leather crocodile they find with strange gleaming eyes.

Cast
 Tommi Ohrner: Victor Laroche
 Carolin Ohrner: Cora Laroche
 Evelyn Palek: Louise Laroche
 Robert Naegele: Friedrich Mörlin
 Oskar von Schwab: Onkel
 Erik Jelde: Herr Opitz
 Nora Minor: Frau Debisch
 Matthias Eysen: Herr von Strichninsky

Episodes
1. Der Mann im Spiegel (The Man in the Mirror)
2. Der nächtliche Besucher (The Nocturnal Visitor)
3. Die Geburtstagsfeier (The Birthday Celebration)
4. Eine neue Entdeckung (A New Discovery)
5. Gewitter in der Nacht (Storm in the Night)
6. Ein unerwartetes Geständnis (An Unexpected Confession)

Feature film
In October 2011 it was announced that a feature film adaptation of the story was being filmed. The film  was released on March 21, 2012 and starred Kristo Ferkic as Victor and his real-life siblings Joanna and Vijessna Ferkic as Cora and Louise. Tommi Ohrner, who played Victor in the original series, also appeared in the film, this time in a cameo role as Victor's father.

References

External links
 

1976 German television series debuts
1976 German television series endings
German children's television series
Television shows based on children's books
Television shows based on German novels
German-language television shows
Das Erste original programming